Kickapoo Township may refer to:

 Kickapoo Township, Peoria County, Illinois
 Kickapoo Township, Leavenworth County, Kansas
 Kickapoo Township, Platte County, Missouri
 Kickapoo Township, Kidder County, North Dakota
 Kickapoo Township, Mountrail County, North Dakota in Mountrail County, North Dakota
 Kickapoo Township, a township in Lincoln County, Oklahoma

See also
 Kickapoo (disambiguation)